These are the complete European Championship and Formula One results for Mercedes-Benz.

Complete European Championship results
(key) (results in bold indicate pole position, results in italics indicate fastest lap)

Notes

Complete Formula One results

As a constructor

1954–1955
(key)

Notes

2010s
(key)

2020s
(key)

Notes
* – Season still in progress.
† – The driver did not finish the Grand Prix, but was classified, as he completed over 90% of the race distance.
‡ – Half points awarded as less than 75% of the race distance was completed.

Results of other Mercedes cars
(key)

As an engine supplier

Non-championship Formula One results
(key)

References

Formula One constructor results
Mercedes-Benz in motorsport
results